The Bahadur Group, or the Special Services Group as it was initially formed, was a Special Forces unit within the Indian National Army that was tasked with frontline intelligence as well as subversion and sabotage operations behind enemy lines. This was the INA's second special forces unit besides the Intelligence group led by Colonel Shaukat Hayat Malikof Bhawalpur Regiment who  is credited with raising the flag of Azad Hind in Moirang in 14 April 1944, an event accepted as one of the first instances of the liberation of Indian soil by an independent Indian government.
They were two parts to the organization: the Special Service Group and the Secret Service Group. Both of these groups were trained in commando tactics, sabotage,intelligence collection and deep penetration missions in India while some members received training in Linguistics in order to liaison with local Japanese units. Usually operating in groups of 8 to 10 members of the Bahadur group were attached to local Japanese divisions in order to spread propaganda among Indian troops in the British Indian army and to act as pathfinders.

Military units and formations of the Indian National Army
Special forces